The Wang Theatre is a theatre in Boston. It originally opened in 1925 as the  Metropolitan Theatre and was later renamed the Music Hall. It was designed by Clarence Blackall and is located at 252–272 Tremont Street in the Boston Theatre District. The theatre is operated as part of the Boch Center. The theatre was designated as a Boston Landmark by the Boston Landmarks Commission in 1990.

Metropolitan Theatre
The structure was originally known as the Metropolitan Theatre when it opened in 1925. The Metropolitan Theatre was developed by Max Shoolman and designed by architect Clarence Blackall, with the assistance of Detroit theatre architect C. Howard Crane. It seats more than 3,600 people.

Music Hall
In 1962 it became the home of the Boston Ballet and was renamed the Music Hall. During the 1960s and 1970s, audiences could see the Stuttgart Opera, the Metropolitan Opera, Bolshoi Ballet and Kirov Ballet as well as popular movies and performing artists. With time though, they could no longer attract the large touring companies because of the size of their stage as well as their outdated production facilities. Converted to a non-profit center in 1980 and renamed the Metropolitan Center, they were able to attract theatrical performances again.

Bob Marley and the Wailers 1978 concert at the Music Hall was released in 2015 in honor of Bob Marley's birthday as Bob Marley And The Wailers – Live: Boston Music Hall (June 8th 1978).

Wang Center

In 1983, Dr. An Wang made a very large donation and the Wang Center was born. From 1989–1992, $9.8 million was raised to restore the Theatre to "its glory days of the 1920s". Boston based architecture firm Finegold Alexander + Associates Inc restored the theatre with Conrad Schmitt Studios performing the elegant decoration, gilded moldings, murals, scagliola and marbleized surfaces.

In 2008, the Citi Performing Arts Center announced a co-booking arrangement with The Madison Square Garden Company for the Wang Theatre.

The lobby was used in the movies American Hustle, for the live band performance and casino scenes, and The Witches of Eastwick, as part of the house in which Jack Nicholson's character lived. It was also used for numerous scenes in the ABC TV pilot Gilded Lilys.

See also
 National Register of Historic Places listings in northern Boston, Massachusetts

External links
 City of Boston, Landmarks Commission. The Wang Center Study Report, 1990

References

Theatres on the National Register of Historic Places in Massachusetts
Buildings and structures in Boston
Theatres in Boston
Boston Theater District
1925 establishments in Massachusetts
Buildings and structures completed in 1925
National Register of Historic Places in Boston